József Piroska (born 20 July 1930) is a Hungarian former alpine skier. He competed in two events at the 1952 Winter Olympics.

References

External links
 

1930 births
Possibly living people
Hungarian male alpine skiers
Olympic alpine skiers of Hungary
Alpine skiers at the 1952 Winter Olympics
Skiers from Budapest
20th-century Hungarian people